Sunny Day is an animated children's television series produced by Silvergate Media. The series revolves around Sunny (voiced by Lilla Crawford), a tween-age hairdresser who runs her own beauty salon with the help of her dog Doodle (Rob Morrison), hair colorist Rox (Élan Luz Rivera), and receptionist Blair (Taylor Louderman). Sunny's best customers are Timmy (Kevin Duda), who is in charge of hosting events and shows in Sunny's hometown, and Cindy (Melissa van der Schyff), the unlucky town baker who has a constant bad hair day. The series is loosely based on the Random House picture book series The Fairytale Hairdresser by Abie Longstaff and illustrated by Lauren Beard. Each episode features an original song written by Peter Lurye.

For the first season, 40 episodes were produced by Silvergate in association with the Canadian animation company Pipeline Studios. On April 5, 2016, the show was renewed for a second season of 20 episodes. The series premiered on Nickelodeon in the United States on August 21, 2017. New episodes moved to the separate Nick Jr. Channel in October 2018. The show also aired in Canada on Treehouse TV and on Nick Jr. and Milkshake! in the United Kingdom.

Premise
Taking place in the seaside town of Friendly Falls, the series follows a professional hairstylist named Sunny who works at her own salon. Sunny uses her creativity and knowledge of hair care to solve problems. The other salon employees are Sunny's talking dog Doodle, Rox the hair colourist, and Blair the receptionist. Sunny's best customers are Timmy, who hosts every town event in Friendly Falls, and Cindy, the unlucky local baker with constantly messy hair.

While the setting of the series is different, the message and characterization mirror Abie Longstaff's original vision in The Fairytale Hairdresser books, which feature salon-owner Kittie Lacey, "the facilitator and the problem-solver … at the heart of the community" "who works hard, defeats evil-doers, [and] shows solidarity with the girls she helps."

Characters

Main
 Sunny (voiced by Lilla Crawford in the US and Lily Portman in the UK) is a creative tween-aged hair stylist who runs her own salon. She has multi-colored hair (mainly blonde with pink, purple, and red streaks).
 Doodle (voiced by Rob Morrison in the US and Chris Garner in the UK) is Sunny's talking pet dog and sidekick.
 Rox (voiced by Élan Luz Rivera in the US and Abigail Wisdom in the UK) is the fun-loving hair colorist at Sunny's salon.
 Blair (voiced by Taylor Louderman in the US and Eleanor Snowdon in the UK) is the cheerful and happy-go-lucky receptionist and manicurist at Sunny's salon.

Recurring
 Timmy (voiced by Kevin Duda in the US and Alan Medcroft in the UK) is one of Sunny's friends. He is in charge of town events.
 Cindy (voiced by Melissa van der Schyff in the US and Imogen Sharp in the UK) is the town baker.
 Junior (voiced by Denim Steele and Jesus Del Orden) is Rox's younger brother. He is 6 in his first few appearances and turns 7 in "Clowning Around".
 Johnny-Ray (voiced by Kyle Dean Massey)

Antagonists
 Lacey (voiced by Sarah Stiles) is a topiary tree artist and pageant queen.
 KC (also voiced by Melissa van der Schyff) is Lacey's talking poodle.
 Scratch (voiced by Josh Ruben in the US and Alan Medcroft in the UK) is the strong-willed neighborhood dogcatcher.

Episodes

Broadcast
Sunny Day debuted on Treehouse TV in Canada in September 2017 and debuted on Nick Jr. in the United Kingdom on 2 March 2018. The series debuted in Australia on Nick Jr. on 19 February 2018.

Home media
Nickelodeon and Paramount Home Entertainment released the first DVD of the show with the same title on May 22, 2018. They then released a second DVD, Welcome to Pet Parlor, on September 3, 2019. On March 24, 2021, the first season was added to Paramount+, with the second season being added on September 15.

Awards and nominations

Merchandise
Books are released, and a toy line from Mattel was confirmed.

References

External links
 
 

2010s American animated television series
2020s American animated television series
2017 American television series debuts
2020 American television series endings
2010s British animated television series
2020s British animated television series
2017 British television series debuts
2020 British television series endings
2010s Canadian animated television series
2020s Canadian animated television series
2017 Canadian television series debuts
2020 Canadian television series endings
American children's animated comedy television series
American children's animated fantasy television series
American children's animated musical television series
American flash animated television series
American preschool education television series
British children's animated comedy television series
British children's animated fantasy television series
British children's animated musical television series
British flash animated television series
British preschool education television series
Canadian children's animated comedy television series
Canadian children's animated fantasy television series
Canadian children's animated musical television series
Canadian flash animated television series
Canadian preschool education television series
Animated preschool education television series
2010s preschool education television series
2020s preschool education television series
English-language television shows
2010s Nickelodeon original programming
Nick Jr. original programming
Treehouse TV original programming
Fictional hairdressers
Fictional duos
Animated television series about children
Anime-influenced Western animated television series
Television series by Sony Pictures Television